is a Japanese shōnen romantic comedy manga written and illustrated by Mizuki Kawashita. It depicts vignettes in the love lives of eight girls in middle school and high school. The anime television series adaptation was produced by J.C.Staff and directed by Yoshiki Yamakawa, with character designs by Tomoyuki Shitaya. The opening theme is "Future Stream" by sphere, and the ending theme is "Hatsukoi Limited" by marble. The series aired from April 11 to June 27, 2009 in Japan on BS11.

Episode list

References

External links 
 Official site 
 

First Love Limited